Paulo Alexandre Almeida Santos, better known by his stage name Coyote Beatz or simply Coyote, is a Brazilian hip hop producer, DJ, and member of the underground hip hop group DV Tribo. Coyote is known for his work with Brazilian rapper Djonga, although he has worked with various artists, including Emicida, Fenda, FBC, among others.

Career
In 2013, Coyote Beatz and Djonga worked together for the first time. Gradually, the Brazilian music producer began to gather recognition in the Hip Hop scene with his diverse boom bap and trap instrumentals. During this period, Coyote also presented his beats at local events in Belo Horizonte, mainly organized by the Família de Rua collective at the Duelo de MCs. Some notable work from Coyote can be encountered in Djonga's album Histórias da Minha Área.

Coyote also produced Emicida's single Papel, Caneta e Coração, which was well received in Brazil and aided the music producer in obtaining some initial notoriety.

Recently, Coyote Beatz released the album BE$T $ELLER OF DJONGA, which compiles the most well known instrumentals produced by the beatmaker that were utilized in Djonga's music.

By using classic Rock and Samba references, Coyote Beatz also creates compositions influenced by experimental electronic music and obscure soundtracks.

In 2018, Coyote won the Prêmio Genius Brasil de Música award for best producer.

Production credits

with Djonga

Instrumental Albums

Video Clips
2018 – A Música da Mãe (with Djonga)

Awards
Prêmio Genius Brasil de Música Brasileira 2018 (winner for best producer)

References

Hip hop record producers
Living people
Year of birth missing (living people)